The Scout and Guide movement in Tonga is served by
 Tonga branch of The Scout Association
 The Girl Guides Association of the Kingdom of Tonga, associate of the World Association of Girl Guides and Girl Scouts

References

See also